A connotation is a commonly understood cultural or emotional association that  any given word or phrase carries, in addition to its explicit or literal meaning, which is its denotation.

A connotation is frequently described as either positive or negative, with regard to its pleasing or displeasing emotional connection. For example, a stubborn person may be described as being either strong-willed or pig-headed; although these have the same literal meaning (stubborn), strong-willed connotes admiration for the level of someone's will (a positive connotation), while pig-headed connotes frustration in dealing with someone (a negative connotation).

Usage
"Connotation" branches into a mixture of different meanings. These could include the contrast of a word or phrase with its primary, literal meaning (known as a denotation), with what that word or phrase specifically denotes. The connotation essentially relates to how anything may be associated with a word or phrase; for example, an implied value, judgement or feelings.

Logic
In logic and semantics, connotation is roughly synonymous with intension. Connotation is often contrasted with denotation, which is more or less synonymous with extension. Alternatively, the connotation of the word may be thought of as the set of all its possible referents (as opposed to merely the actual ones). A word's denotation is the collection of things it refers to; its connotation is what it implies about the things it is used to refer to ( a second level of meanings is termed connotative ). The connotation of dog is (something like) four-legged canine carnivore. So saying, "You are a dog" would connote that you were ugly or aggressive rather than literally denoting you as a canine.

Related terms
It is often useful to avoid words with strong connotations (especially pejorative or disparaging ones) when striving to achieve a neutral point of view. A desire for more positive connotations, or fewer negative ones, is one of the main reasons for using euphemisms.

Semiotic closure, as defined by Terry Eagleton, concerns "a sealed world of ideological stability, which repels the disruptive, decentered forces of language in the name of an imaginary unity. Signs are ranked by a certain covert violence into rigidly hierarchical order. . . . The process of forging ‘representations’ always involves this arbitrary closing of the signifying chain, constricting the free play of the signifier to a spuriously determinate meaning which can then be received by the subject as natural and inevitable".

Synonyms 

 Implied. The denotation of a heart implies  love.
 Impressionistic
 Evocative
 Indirect
 Inferred
 etc.

Examples

See also

Context as Other Minds
Double entendre
Extension
Extensional definition
Intension
Intensional definition
Loaded language
Metacommunicative competence
Pun
Semantic differential
Semantic property
Subtext

References

 
Concepts in logic
Meaning (philosophy of language)
Semantics
Subjective experience